Robert Hunter Caldwell (August 15, 1951 – March 14, 2023) was an American singer, songwriter, and musician. He released several albums spanning R&B, soul, jazz, and adult contemporary. He is known for his soulful and versatile vocals. Caldwell released the hit single and his signature song "What You Won't Do for Love" from his double platinum debut album Bobby Caldwell in 1978. After several R&B and smooth jazz albums, Caldwell turned to singing standards from the Great American Songbook. He wrote many songs for other artists, including the Billboard Hot 100 No. 1 single "The Next Time I Fall" for Amy Grant and Peter Cetera. Caldwell's music is frequently sampled by hip hop and R&B artists.

Early life
Bobby Caldwell was born in Manhattan, but grew up in Miami, Florida. His mother sold real estate and one of her clients was reggae singer Bob Marley; Caldwell and Marley became friends. Growing up in Miami exposed Caldwell to a variety of music such as Haitian, Latin, reggae, and R&B. His parents hosted a local variety television show called Suppertime. He grew up listening to the music of Frank Sinatra and Ella Fitzgerald. When he was 12, Caldwell started playing piano and guitar. He was drawn to rock and roll, jazz, and rhythm and blues.

Career
Caldwell was a member of a Miami band called Katmandu who wrote much of their material while also performing traditional standards. Caldwell played multiple instruments and sang. At 17, he worked with the band in Las Vegas, then moved to Los Angeles. 

Caldwell got his first career break as a rhythm guitarist for Little Richard in the early 1970s. Caldwell and his band eventually left Little Richard, and Caldwell went solo. By 1977, he had spent six years in Los Angeles playing in different bar bands and trying to get a record deal. Caldwell eventually signed with TK Records in Miami in 1978. After songs for his first album were recorded, executives told Caldwell they enjoyed the album, but thought it was lacking a hit. Caldwell returned to the studio for two days and wrote "What You Won't Do for Love". TK was mainly an R&B label popular among African American listeners. Executives at the label wanted to conceal the fact that Caldwell was white, so they kept his face off the album cover. When he toured with Natalie Cole to support the album, most of the audience was black and many were surprised that Caldwell was white.

"What You Won't Do for Love" on Bobby Caldwell reached the top ten on the Billboard magazine Hot 100 (No. 9) R&B (No. 6), and Adult Contemporary (No. 10) charts. The song has been covered, remade and sampled many times. Caldwell remade it in 1998. It was covered by Go West, Phyllis Hyman, Roy Ayers, Michael Bolton, Intro, Boyz II Men and Snoh Aalegra and was sampled by Tupac Shakur for his hit "Do for Love". It was covered by Elliott Yamin during the fifth season of American Idol in 2006. Caldwell's track "My Flame" is sampled for "Sky's the Limit" by The Notorious B.I.G. featuring R&B group 112.

Caldwell's debut album was followed by Cat in the Hat (1980) and Carry On (1982). The track "Open Your Eyes" from Cat in the Hat was sampled by J Dilla on Common's "The Light" from his 2000 album "Like Water for Chocolate". "Open Your Eyes" was also covered by artists John Legend and Dwele. For the album Carry On, Caldwell played all the instruments, was the producer and helped with arranging and mixing. In 2019, Lil Nas X was sued for $25 million for using the song "Carry On" (from the album of the same name) without permission in his own song of the same name from his 2018 mixtape Nasaratti, which at the time was available on YouTube, Spotify and SoundCloud. In 1983, Caldwell released August Moon only in Japan. It was released in the United States in the 1990s.

Singer Boz Scaggs advised Caldwell to write songs for other musicians after TK Records shut down. Caldwell wrote "The Next Time I Fall", which became a hit for Amy Grant and Peter Cetera, along with songs for Scaggs himself, Roy Ayers, Chicago, Natalie Cole, Neil Diamond, Roberta Flack, and Al Jarreau.

On Blue Condition (1996), Caldwell turned from R&B to recording big band arrangements of songs from the Great American Songbook, particularly those sung by Frank Sinatra. He also portrayed Sinatra in tributes to the Rat Pack in Las Vegas. He continued to sing standards on Come Rain or Come Shine (1999), The Consummate Bobby Caldwell (2010) and After Dark (2014). In 2015, he collaborated with record producer Jack Splash on the album Cool Uncle.

Death
Caldwell died at his home in the Great Meadows section of Independence Township, New Jersey, on March 14, 2023. He was 71. His death was announced the following day by his wife, who stated on Twitter that "Bobby passed away here at home. I held him tight in my arms as he left us. I am forever heartbroken. Thanks to all of you for your many prayers over the years." According to Regenerative Medicine LA, Caldwell's health had declined after suffering severe side effects from fluoroquinolone.

Film soundtracks

Caldwell wrote and performed songs for the movies Back to School ("Educated Girl"), Mac and Me ("Take Me, I'll Follow You"), Salsa ("Puerto Rico") and its sequel ("Every Teardrop"). He also recorded a song for the 1984 film Night of the Comet ("Never Give Up"). Due to what he has cited in interviews as a lower cost of use than the original recordings, his versions of big band standards have appeared in several films. Examples include Simone (2001) and Lake Boat (2002).

Aside from a minor role in 1988's Salsa, Caldwell portrayed Frank Sinatra from October 1999 to January 2000 in the Las Vegas musical The Rat Pack Is Back.

Japanese audience

Caldwell is popular in Japan, where he was nicknamed "Mister AOR". In Japan, the acronym "AOR"  (AOR short for "Adult Oriented Rock") is used to describe the style commonly called Adult Contemporary in the United States. In 1992, he received the award for Best Foreign Artist at the 34th Japan Record Awards.

Discography

Albums

Compilation albums

Singles

References

External links
 BobbyCaldwell.com (Official site)
 Complete discography and lyrics 
 
 

1951 births
2023 deaths
American rhythm and blues singer-songwriters
American multi-instrumentalists
People from Independence Township, New Jersey
Singers from New York City
Smooth jazz musicians
American soul singers
Ballad musicians
Singer-songwriters from New York (state)
Atlantic Records artists
Polydor Records artists